SOARING is a magazine published monthly as a membership benefit of the Soaring Society of America. It was first published in 1937. The headquarters is in Hobbs, New Mexico. The magazine's article topics include safety issues and accounts of individual gliding accomplishments.

References

Monthly magazines published in the United States
Sports magazines published in the United States
Aviation magazines
English-language magazines
Gliding in the United States
Magazines established in 1937
Magazines published in New Mexico

Internal Link